The Minister for Railways was a ministry first established in 1916 in the nationalist ministry of William Holman and abolished in 1929. It was known as the Minister for Railways and State Industrial Enterprises in the Second Fuller ministry between 1922 and 1925.

Role and responsibilities
The first public railway line in New South Wales was the Sydney–Parramatta Railway which opened on 26 September 1855. The Treasurer had ministerial responsibility for railways.

The portfolio of Minister for Railways was created in the  Holman Nationalist ministry and had operational responsibility for the railways while the Secretary for Public Works had responsibility for authorising expenditure on any new lines or extensions that exceeded £20,000.  The separation however was only at a department level as the portfolio was always held by the Secretary for Public Works.

In the second Fuller ministry the portfolio of Labour and Industry was divided up, with the Minister for Railways receiving the additional responsibilities for state industrial enterprises. The portfolio returned to be the Minister for Railways from the first Lang ministry. On 16 April 1929 Ernest Buttenshaw, the Secretary for Public Works and Minister for Railways, became Acting Premier during the absence of Thomas Bavin and resigned the railways portfolio. The ministerial office was not filled and instead the railways department was administered by the Treasurer.

The operation of railways remained the responsibility of the Treasurer in the third Lang ministry until 22 March 1932 when it became the responsibility of the Minister for Transport.

List of ministers

References

Railways